Climbin' the Walls is the debut studio album by American heavy metal band Wrathchild America, released in 1989 by Atlantic Records. The album was moderately successful, becoming the band's only album to chart on the Billboard 200, where it peaked at #190. A music video for "Climbin' the Walls" was released to promote this album.

Reception

Climbin' the Walls received generally positive reviews. Eduardo Rivadavia from AllMusic gave the album a score of two stars out of five, and said that it is "full of speedy, muscular riffs, complex time changes, and superb drumming."

Track listing

Personnel
 Brad Divens -  lead vocals, 4, 5, 12 string bass 
 Jay Abbene - guitar, backing vocals
 Terry Carter -  6 & 12 string guitars, vocals
 Shannon Larkin - drums, vocals

References

1989 albums
Wrathchild America albums